The Hungarian Justice and Life Party (MIÉP) was a nationalist political party in Hungary that was founded by István Csurka in 1993.

In the 1998 legislative elections, the party won 5.5% of the votes and gained parliamentary representation, with 14 seats.

In the 2002 elections, the party won 4.4% of the popular vote and no seats.

In 2005, MIÉP joined forces with a newer, radical Hungarian nationalist political party, Jobbik. The new political formation was registered under the name the MIÉP–Jobbik Third Way Alliance of Parties. It purported to speak for Christians whilst standing up for the rights of Hungarian minorities in the neighbouring countries. The programme was based on a "law and order" agenda, in order to crack down on crime. Following an acrimonious failure in the 2006 elections the alliance broke up. In the aftermath, MIÉP lost its leadership of the far-right forces in Hungary, with Jobbik going on to achieve success in the 2010 elections.

Csurka died on 4 February 2012, aged 77, after a long illness. He was replaced by former MP Zoltán Fenyvessy. In 2017, Zoltán Fenyvessy was replaced by Tibor Nagy.

In early 2019, Our Homeland Movement (Mi Hazánk Mozgalom) made an alliance with Hungarian Justice and Life Party and the agrarian Independent Smallholders, Agrarian Workers and Civic Party.

On 27 July 2021, the MIÉP was dissolved, and merged into the Our Homeland Movement.

Party leaders

Parliamentary representation

National Assembly 

1In an electoral alliance with Jobbik, under the name of the "MIÉP–Jobbik Third Way Alliance of Parties", joined by Independent Smallholders’ Party (FKgP) organisations from 15 counties.

2In an electoral alliance with Smallholders' Party.

European Parliament

References

External links
Official website
"Third way" platform: The nationalist right gets together (HVG)
Far Right tries to take control of the revolt The Times, September 23, 2006

1993 establishments in Hungary
Christian political parties in Hungary
Euronat members
Far-right political parties in Hungary
Nationalist parties in Hungary
Political parties established in 1993
Social conservative parties
Right-wing parties in Europe
2021 disestablishments in Hungary
Political parties disestablished in 2021
Defunct political parties in Hungary